Agesipolis III (died 183 BC) was the 32nd and last of the kings of the Agiad dynasty in ancient Sparta.

Agesipolis was the son of another Agesipolis and grandson of Cleombrotus II and Chilonis, daughter of Leonidas II and Cratesiclea. After the death of Cleomenes III he was elected king while still a minor, and placed under the dubious guardianship of an uncle named Cleomenes.  Agesipolis was, however, soon deposed by his colleague Lycurgus.  In 195 BC, he was at the head of the Lacedaemonian exiles, who joined Titus Quinctius Flamininus in his attack upon Nabis, the tyrant of Lacedaemon (see War against Nabis).  Agesipolis was a member of an embassy sent about 183 to Rome by the Lacedaemonian exiles, and, with his companions, was intercepted by pirates and killed.

References

183 BC deaths
3rd-century BC rulers
3rd-century BC Spartans
2nd-century BC Spartans
Agiad kings of Sparta
Year of birth unknown
Ancient Greeks who were murdered
Deaths in the Aegean Sea